Cobalt(II,III) oxide is an inorganic compound with the formula Co3O4. It is one of two well characterized cobalt oxides. It is a black antiferromagnetic solid.  As a mixed valence compound, its formula is sometimes written as CoIICoIII2O4 and sometimes as CoO•Co2O3.

Structure 
Co3O4 adopts the normal spinel structure, with Co2+ ions in tetrahedral interstices and Co3+ ions in the octahedral interstices of the cubic close-packed lattice of oxide anions.

Synthesis 
Cobalt(II) oxide, CoO, converts to Co3O4 upon heating at around 600–700 °C in air. Above 900 °C, CoO is stable.  These reaction are described by the following equilibrium:
2 Co3O4    6 CoO  +  O2

Applications
Cobalt(II,III) oxide is used as a blue coloring agent for pottery enamel and glass, as an alternative to cobalt(II) oxide.

Cobalt(II,III) oxide is used as an electrode in some lithium-ion batteries, possibly in the form of cobalt oxide nanoparticles.

Safety
Cobalt compounds are potentially poisonous in large amounts.

See also
Cobalt(II) oxide
Cobalt(III) oxide

References 

Cobalt compounds
Mixed valence compounds
Transition metal oxides